This is a list of major poets of the Modernist movement.

English-language Modernist poets

Marion Angus
W. H. Auden
Djuna Barnes
Rupert Brooke
Basil Bunting
Hart Crane
E. E. Cummings
H.D.
Cecil Day-Lewis
T. S. Eliot
Robert Frost
Robert Graves
Robert Hayden
Gerard Manley Hopkins (precursor)
A. E. Housman
Langston Hughes
T. E. Hulme 
Randall Jarrell
David Jones
Rudyard Kipling
D. H. Lawrence
Vachel Lindsay
Amy Lowell

Mina Loy
Hugh MacDiarmid
Archibald MacLeish
Louis MacNeice
Marianne Moore
Wilfred Owen
Dorothy Parker
Ezra Pound
E. A. Robinson
Edna St. Vincent Millay 
Delmore Schwartz
Edith Sitwell
Kenneth Slessor
Gertrude Stein
Wallace Stevens
Allen Tate
Robert Penn Warren
William Carlos Williams
Yvor Winters
W. B. Yeats
Louis Zukofsky

European Modernist poets 

Anna Akhmatova
Guillaume Apollinaire
Louis Aragon
Gottfried Benn
André Breton
Constantine Cavafy
René Char
Charles Baudelaire
Robert Desnos
Gunnar Ekelöf
Paul Éluard
Georg Heym
Jakob van Hoddis
Max Jacob
Srečko Kosovel
Benjamin Péret
Saint-John Perse

Fernando Pessoa
Jacques Prévert
Pierre Reverdy
Rainer Maria Rilke
Arthur Rimbaud 
Else Lasker-Schüler
Federico García Lorca
Artur Lundkvist
Stéphane Mallarmé
Harry Martinson
Henri Michaux
Birger Sjöberg
August Stramm
Giorgos Seferis
Philippe Soupault
Jules Supervielle
Edith Södergran
Georg Trakl
Paul Valéry

See also
Modernist poetry
Modernism
Modernist literature
List of poetry groups and movements
European literature

Modernist